Xavier Ribas Centelles (born 16 February 1976) is a field hockey defender from Spain. He represented the Men's National Team at three consecutive Summer Olympics, starting in 2000.

References
 Spanish Olympic Committee

External links

1976 births
Living people
Field hockey players from Catalonia
Spanish male field hockey players
Male field hockey defenders
Sportspeople from Terrassa
Olympic field hockey players of Spain
1998 Men's Hockey World Cup players
Field hockey players at the 2000 Summer Olympics
2002 Men's Hockey World Cup players
Field hockey players at the 2004 Summer Olympics
2006 Men's Hockey World Cup players
Field hockey players at the 2008 Summer Olympics
2010 Men's Hockey World Cup players
Olympic silver medalists for Spain
Olympic medalists in field hockey
Medalists at the 2008 Summer Olympics
Uhlenhorster HC players
Atlètic Terrassa players